Oswald Chettle Mazengarb  (31 May 1890 – 27 November 1963), known as Ossie Mazengarb, was a New Zealand barrister.

Biography

Mazengarb was born in Prahran, a suburb of Melbourne, in 1890. His family moved to Dunedin soon after his birth and he received his education at Otago Boys' High School, which he attended from 1903 to 1905. From 1908 to 1911, he studied for a bachelor of arts at Otago University. A scholarship in political economy enabled him to study a further year and he graduated with a master of arts in 1912. He then moved to Wellington to study law at Victoria College and obtained a bachelor of law in 1914 and a master of law in 1917. He was a member of the debating club at both universities and at Victoria,  

Mazengarb was admitted to the bar in 1914. He formed a partnership with John Barton in 1915. Barton was appointed magistrate in Gisborne and had to dissolve the partnership. Mazengarb was joined by Ernst Peterson Hay and Robert Macalister and their practice soon rose to one of the largest in the capital city.

Mazengarb wrote a few legal textbooks. He was appointed in 1950 as one of the so-called suicide squad in the Legislative Council to vote for its abolition.

Alongside Alfred North, Mazengarb was appointed King's Counsel on 18 April 1947. In the 1953 Coronation Honours, Mazengarb was appointed a Commander of the Order of the British Empire, for charitable and public services, especially in the field of law.

A well-known public appointment was in 1954, by the National government of the time, to chair the Special Committee on Moral Delinquency in Children and Adolescents, otherwise better known as the Mazengarb Report. 

On 6 April 1920 at St John's Church in Invercargill, Mazengarb married Margaret Isabel Campbell. The couple had three daughters. Mazengarb died in Wellington on 27 November 1963.

Publications (partial list)
 The law relating to negligence on the highway (first edition, Wellington: Butterworth, 1942; second edition, Sydney: Butterworth, 1952)
 Advocacy in our time (London and Wellington: Sweet and Maxwell, 1964)
 Mazengarb's negligence on the highway: law and practice in Australia, third edition (Sydney: Butterworths, 1957)
 Mazengarb's law and practice relating to actions for negligence on the highway, fourth edition (Sydney: Butterworths, 1962)
 Report of the Special Committee on Moral Delinquency in Children and Adolescents (Wellington: Government Printer, 1954) [chairperson] (Project Gutenberg edition also available)

See also
 List of King's and Queen's Counsel in New Zealand

References

External links

 The text of the Mazengarb Report at ibiblio
 

1890 births
1963 deaths
20th-century New Zealand lawyers
New Zealand writers
New Zealand National Party MLCs
New Zealand Commanders of the Order of the British Empire
New Zealand King's Counsel
Australian emigrants to New Zealand
Unsuccessful candidates in the 1938 New Zealand general election
Unsuccessful candidates in the 1935 New Zealand general election
Politicians from Dunedin
People educated at Otago Boys' High School
Victoria University of Wellington alumni
University of Otago alumni